Sara Bottarelli (born 8 October 1990) is an Italian female long-distance runner and mountain runner who won at individual senior level a medal at the European Mountain Running Championships (and two others with the national team) and two medals with the national team at the World Mountain Running Championships.

Biography
Sara Bottarelli is the granddaughter of another Italian mountain runner, Valentina Bottarelli (born 1948).

National titles
She won a national championship at individual senior level.
Italian Long Distance Mountain Running Championships
Individual: 2016

See also
 Italy at the World Mountain Running Championships
 Italy at the European Mountain Running Championships

References

External links
 

1990 births
Living people
Italian female long-distance runners
Italian female marathon runners
Italian female mountain runners